Linear gingival erythema (LGE) is a periodontal disorder diagnosed based on distinct clinical characteristics.  It was originally thought that LGE was directly associated with HIV, and it was thus called HIV-associated gingivitis (HIV-G).  Later research confirmed that LGE also occurs in HIV negative immunocompromised patients, and it was thus renamed.

Presentation
LGE is limited to the soft tissue of the periodontium, appearing as a red line 2–3 mm in width adjacent to the free gingival margin.  Unlike conventional periodontal disease, though, LGE is not significantly associated with increased levels of dental plaque.

The prevalence of LGE remains unclear and there is no known treatment.

References

Periodontal disorders